Abu Faris Abdelaziz ibn Abdarrahman al-Malzuzi al-Miknasi (born in Meknes, died 1298) is considered to be the greatest poet of the Marinid period. He is also well known as a historian. There is little known about his life, besides that he was the court poet of Abu Yahya ibn Abd al-Haqq. Among his many poetical works is a long didactic poem about the history of prophets. According to Ibn al-Khatib (the biographer of Ibn Abd al-Haqq) Al-Malzuzi mixed his Arabic with Zenata elements. He was from the Berber Malzuza tribe of Tripolitania. He died incarcerated, in 1297-1298.

Notes

References
E. Levi-Provençal: "Un historiographe et poète de cour mérinide: Abu Faris al-Malzuzi." in:Faculté de Lettres de l'Université d'Alger, Annales de l'Institut d'Etudes Orientales, Paris & Alger: Libraire Larose & Université d'Alger, 1934-1962
Gannun, `Abd Allah, Abd al-`Aziz al-Malzuzi, Titwan : Ma`had Mawlay al-Hasan, 1950

Year of birth unknown
1298 deaths
13th-century Berber people
13th-century Moroccan historians
Berber historians
Berber poets
Berber writers
13th-century Moroccan poets
People from Meknes
People from Fez, Morocco